Grandview Consolidated School District #4 (GC-4), also Grandview C-4 School District is a school district headquartered in Grandview, Missouri.

The district, which serves most of Grandview and portions of southern Kansas City and Lee's Summit.  it had over 600 employees with over 330 teachers, over 260 classified employees, and about 30 administrators; and about 4,300 students.

The district was established in 1914.

Schools
High school:
 Grandview High School (GHS)

K-8:
 Martin City K-8 Schools

Middle schools:
 Grandview Middle School (GMS)

Elementary schools:
 Belvidere Elementary School
 Butcher-Greene Elementary School
 Conn-West Elementary School
 Meadowmere Elementary School

Preschool:
 High Grove

Alternative:
 Center for Alternative Instructional Resources (CAIR)

References

External links
 
School districts in Missouri
Education in Jackson County, Missouri
Education in Kansas City, Missouri
Lee's Summit, Missouri
1914 establishments in Missouri
School districts established in 1914